East Bakersfield High School is a 9-12 high school located in Bakersfield, CA.

Built in 1938, EBHS, commonly called "East" or "EB", is the second oldest high school in Bakersfield after Bakersfield High School.

Athletics
EBHS sports teams are called the Blades, and have their home games on campus.  The Blades participate in the Southeast Yosemite League (Div. II, CIF Central Section) and have Varsity, JV and Frosh/Soph teams.  Below are all the sports that EBHS participates in and their respective seasons:

Fall
Football
Cross Country
Women's Golf
Women's Tennis
Women's Volleyball
Cheerleading
Winter
Men's Basketball
Men's Soccer
Women's Basketball
Women's Soccer
Wrestling
Cheerleading
Spring
Baseball
Men's Golf
Men's Tennis
Softball
Swimming
Track & Field
Cheerleading

Notable alumni
 Johnny Callison: All Star MLB player
 Robert Beltran: Actor
 Louie Cruz Beltran: Musician
 Rick Sawyer: MLB player
 Billy Cowan: MLB player, college basketball player University of Utah
 Fred Boyd: Professional basketball player, fifth overall pick of 1972 NBA draft
 J. R. Sakuragi: American-Japanese professional basketball player
 Jeanne Cooper: American actress
 Dave DeRoo:  American rock musician and bassist of the band Adema.
 Brian Welch: singer, songwriter, guitarist, and founding member of the nu metal band Korn
 Rodolfo Cadena: Key member in the Mexican Mafia.

References

High schools in Kern County, California
1938 establishments in California